The Syracuse Orange men's lacrosse team represents Syracuse University in NCAA Division I men's college lacrosse.  The Orange have won 15 national championship titles, and currently compete as a member of the Atlantic Coast Conference men's lacrosse conference. Syracuse plays its home games at the Carrier Dome in Syracuse, New York.

History

Syracuse played its first intercollegiate lacrosse game in 1916, and captured United States Intercollegiate Lacrosse League (USILL) co-championships in 1920, 1922, 1924, and 1925 based on winning the Northern Division. It would claim a coaches' poll national championship in 1957.

The men's lacrosse team competed as independents until 2010 when the former Big East Conference began sponsoring men's lacrosse. It joined the Atlantic Coast Conference from the 2014 season onwards following the athletics program's switch to the ACC.

NCAA national championships

In the modern NCAA era, Syracuse has won 10 national championship titles, in 1983, 1988, 1989, 1993, 1995, 2000, 2002, 2004, 2008, and 2009, with one championship in 1990 vacated due to NCAA rules infractions after an investigation revealed that Nancy Simmons, the wife of Coach Roy Simmons, Jr., had co-signed a car loan for the team's star player, Paul Gait, in the 1990 season.

The Orange's ten NCAA championship titles are the most since the NCAA began holding tournaments in 1971 NCAA Division I.

Big East lacrosse 

Syracuse was one of seven Big East Conference schools that formally began competing in men's lacrosse in 2010. Previously, Syracuse men's lacrosse had remained independent (i.e., unaffiliated with any athletic conference).  The other six Big East schools were Georgetown, Notre Dame, Providence, Rutgers, St. John's, and Villanova.

Head coaches 
Syracuse has had five men's lacrosse head coaches since 1916:

 Laurie D. Cox (1916–1930), 116-40-15 record, .722 winning percentage
 Roy Simmons, Sr. (1931–1970), 253-130-1 record, .660 winning percentage
 Roy Simmons, Jr. (1971–1998), 287-96-0 record, .749 winning percentage
 John Desko (1999–2021), 258-86-0 record, .750 winning percentage
 Gary Gait (2021–present), 7-10-0 record, .412 winning percentage, 

, those coaches combined for a 919-362-16 record, which is a .714 winning percentage, with 15 total national titles.

Individual honors and awards

USILA All-Americans 
Twelve Syracuse Orange men's lacrosse players have been four-time United States Intercollegiate Lacrosse Association All-Americans:

 Brad Kotz (1982–85)
 John Zulberti (1986–89)
 Gary Gait (1987–90)
 Pat McCabe (1988–91)
 Tom Marechek (1989–92)
 Charlie Lockwood (1991–94)
 Roy Colsey (1992–95)
 Ric Beardsley (1992–95)
 Casey Powell (1995–98)
 Ryan Powell (1997-2000)
 Michael Springer (2000–03)
 Mike Powell (2001–04)

Tewaaraton Trophy 

Syracuse has also produced two Tewaaraton Trophy winners:

 Mike Powell (2002, 2004)
 Mike Leveille (2008)

US Lacrosse Hall of Fame 
Twenty-three Orange men's lacrosse players and coaches are enshrined in the United States Lacrosse Hall of Fame:

 Laurie D. Cox (1957)
 Irving Lydecker (1960)
 Frederick A. Fitch (1961)
 Victor Ross (1962; a three-time All American)
 David Periard Sr. (1964)
 Evan Corbin Sr. (1965)
 Victor J. Jenkins (1967)
 William N. Ritch (1972)
 Louis Robbins (1975)
 Stewart Lindsay Jr. (1977)
 John Desko (1979)
 William L. Fuller (1982)
 Jim Brown (1984)
 Ron Fraser (1987)
 Roy Simmons Jr. (1991)
 Oren R. Lyons, Jr. (1992)
 Dick Finley (1999)
 Brad Kotz (2001)
 Gary Gait (2005)
 Thomas Ortese (2005)
 Pat McCabe (2006)
 Tim Nelson (2011)
 Roy Colsey (2011)
 John Zulberti (2015)

Only Johns Hopkins (63) and Maryland (31) have more inductees in the Hall of Fame.

Canadian Lacrosse Hall of Fame 
At least three former Syracuse Orange men's lacrosse player has been inducted in the Canadian Lacrosse Hall of Fame:
 Tom Marechek (2012)
  Gary Gait (2014)
  Paul Gait (2014)

National Lacrosse League Hall of Fame 
Several former Syracuse Orange men's lacrosse players have been inducted into the National Lacrosse League Hall of Fame:
 Gary Gait (2006)
 Paul Gait (2006)
 Tom Marechek (2007)

Traditions 
One notable tradition of the Syracuse program is the number 22 jersey, which is given to the player who is expected to be the team's best overall player. The number has been worn by Gary Gait, Charlie Lockwood, Casey Powell, Ryan Powell, Mike Powell, Dan Hardy, Cody Jamieson, Jojo Marasco, Jordan Evans, Chase Scanlan, and most currently Joey Spallina.

Season Results
The following is a list of Syracuse’s Men's Lacrosse results by season:

{| class="wikitable"

|- align="center"

* - No games played due to World War II.

† - NCAA canceled 2020 collegiate activities due to the COVID-19 pandemic.

See also
Johns Hopkins–Syracuse lacrosse rivalry
Cornell–Syracuse lacrosse rivalry
Hobart–Syracuse lacrosse rivalry
Virginia–Syracuse lacrosse rivalry
NCAA Men's Lacrosse Championship
NCAA Division I men's lacrosse records
USILA

References

Further reading 
 Fisher, Donald M. 2002. Lacrosse: A History of the Game. Baltimore: Johns Hopkins University Press.

External links

 
 2021 Media Guide

Syracuse Orange men's lacrosse
1916 establishments in New York (state)
Lacrosse clubs established in 1916
NCAA Division I men's lacrosse teams